Patterson Lake may refer to:

Australia 

 Patterson Lakes, Victoria

Canada  
 Patterson Lake (Ontario) or Stormy Lake, a lake located on north east boundary of the Restoule Provincial Park in Patterson Township, Ontario
 Patterson Lake (British Columbia) or Hook Lake, a lake located south of the community of Tatla Lake, British Columbia and in Patterson Lake Provincial Park

United States  
 Patterson Lake (Arkansas), a lake in Cross County, Arkansas
 a lake near Hell, Michigan
 a lake in Thurston County, Washington
 Edward Arthur Patterson Lake near Dickinson, North Dakota
 the largest lake within the South Warner Wilderness in northern California
Patterson Lake (Thurston County, Washington) from Thurston County, Washington
Patterson Lake (Washington) from Washington State Route 510